A voiceless palatal implosive is a rare consonantal sound, used in some spoken languages. A dedicated IPA letter, was withdrawn in 1993.

Features
Features of the voiceless palatal implosive:

Occurrence 

See also 
 Voiced palatal implosive

References

External links
 

Palatal consonants
Implosives
Voiceless oral consonants